Xavier Savin (born 15 June 1960) is a French butterfly swimmer. He competed at the 1980 Summer Olympics and the 1984 Summer Olympics.

References

External links
 

1960 births
Living people
French male butterfly swimmers
Olympic swimmers of France
Swimmers at the 1980 Summer Olympics
Swimmers at the 1984 Summer Olympics
Place of birth missing (living people)
Swimmers at the 1979 Mediterranean Games